Jennifer Reeser (born 1968 in Lake Charles, Louisiana) is an American poet. She is the author of several poetry collections, including An Alabaster Flask (2003), Winterproof (2005),  Sonnets from the Dark Lady and Other Poems (2012), The Lalaurie Horror (2013), Indigenous (2019), and Strong Feather (2022).

Reeser has translated poetry by Anna Akhmatova from Russian into English.

Personal life 

Jennifer Reeser is married to Jason Phillip Reeser, a fiction writer. They have five children.

References

External links
Jennifer Reeser - at The Poetry Foundation website.
Jennifer Reeser - the poet's personal website

American women poets
American poets
1968 births
Living people
Poets from Louisiana